Kenny and Beth's Musakal Boat Rides is the first album by King Creosote released by Fence Records and Domino Records, however far from his debut release on Fence alone. It was Anderson's first studio album that wasn't distributed on a CD-R. The album made No. 5 in Rough Trade's top 100 albums of 2003.

Track listing
"Lonepigeon's Wineglass Finale" - 1:37
"Homeboy" - 3:49
"Pulling Up Creels" - 4:00
"Turps" - 3:10
"Spokes" - 2:55
"Counselling" - 1:34
"So Forlorn" - 3:47
"Harper's Dough" - 2:20
"Lavender Moon" - 3:55
"Space" - 5:03
"Meantime" - 3:43
"Missionary" - 3:14
"A Friday Night in New York" - 8:03

References

2003 albums
Domino Recording Company albums
King Creosote albums